Aubigny-en-Artois (literally "Aubigny in Artois") is a commune in the Pas-de-Calais department in northern France.

Geography
A town located 8 miles (13 km) northwest of Arras at the junction of the D73, D74, D75 and D49 roads, just by the N39 Arras-Le Touquet road.

Population

Sights
 The church of St. Kilien, dating from the eighteenth century
 The World War I cemetery
 The World War II memorial

See also
Communes of the Pas-de-Calais department

References

External links

 Commonwealth war graves - Aubigny

Communes of Pas-de-Calais